Nicolo Rafael Barbaro (born 1952), better known as Nick Barbaro, is an American journalist and businessman who is the co-founder of The Austin Chronicle and co-creator of the South by Southwest (SXSW) festival. Barbaro's contributions have helped define the Austin, Texas music community.

He co-owns the South by Southwest festival, which he co-created with Roland Swenson, Louis Black and Louis Jay Meyers in 1987. He is also the publisher of The Austin Chronicle, an alternative weekly newspaper, which he founded in 1981 with Louis Black.

Biography
Barbaro is the son of Marilyn Buferd (Miss America 1946) and Francesco Barbaro, a WWII Italian submarine commander, movie agent and producer. Barbaro grew up in Los Angeles and also Dallas. He attended UCLA where he developed his interest in cinema. 

In the mid-70s he moved to Austin and enrolled in the University of Texas. There he earned a graduate degree in Radio, Television, and Film. While at UT he worked on The Daily Texan where he served as film critic.

He lives in Austin with his wife Susan Moffat.

References

1952 births
Living people
University of Texas alumni